Events in the year 1896 in Bolivia.

Incumbents
President: Mariano Baptista until August 19, Severo Fernández

Events
May 26 - founding of Oruro Royal

Births

Deaths
August 12 - Narciso Campero

 
1890s in Bolivia
Years of the 19th century in Bolivia